Sone Lal Patel (1950-2009) was an Indian leader active in state of Uttar Pradesh. He was the founder of the political party Apna Dal and one of the founding members of Bahujan Samaj Party.

He opposed casteism and social inequality.

Early life 
He was born on 2 July 1950 in Bagulihai village of Kannauj district, to a Kurmi Hindu family. He gained a MSc from Pandit Prithi Nath College, Kanpur. He also had a doctorate in Physics from the Kanpur University. From his early days he was against casteism and social inequality prevailing in the society. He was an advocate of social justice and equality.

Political career

Early political career 
He started his political fight by joining with Chaudhary Charan Singh, stirring in his youth, against social inequality and caste exploitation prevailing in the society. He participated in many protests and rallies across the state and also in other parts of country. In one of such protest he was brutally beaten by police too.

Meeting Kanshiram and BSP 
Meanwhile, Kanshi Ram, who was trying to create a social justice movement in North India, met Patel. Their vision regarding the caste based discrimination and social injustice was very similar to a certain point. At the behest of Kanshi Ram, he made his most remarkable contribution in setting up Bahujan Samaj Party in the form of mission. He is credited as  one of the founders of BSP.

Parting with BSP and founding Apna Dal 
Since his resolutions and objectives were not met in BSP, he separated from Bahujan Samaj Party. One of the reasons for his dissatisfaction was Kanshi Ram's over enthusiasm towards Mayawati and his ignorance towards other leaders.

After that, under social motivation, on 4 November 1995, he formed a political party, Apna Dal. He contested Lok Sabha elections in 2009 from Phulpur (Lok Sabha constituency).

Death and aftermath 
Patel died in a road accident in Kanpur in 2009. A demand for CBI probe was made by his daughter Anupriya Patel.

After his death in 2009, his wife Krishna Patel became National President of Apna Dal. His daughter Anupriya Patel was elected to Lok Sabha in 2014 from Mirzapur (Lok Sabha constituency). Later the party split, Anupriya Patel named her party 'Apna Dal (Sonelal)', and won from Mirzapur again in 2019 in coalition with Bharatiya Janata Party.

References 

1950 births
2009 deaths
Road incident deaths in India
Chhatrapati Shahu Ji Maharaj University alumni
Apna Dal politicians
21st-century Buddhists
Indian Buddhists
Converts to Buddhism from Hinduism
Bahujan Samaj Party politicians from Uttar Pradesh
Accidental deaths in India